Andrew A. Inzer (born December 5, 1979) is a former American football offensive lineman. He attended Brown University and was a practice squad member of the Super Bowl XXXVI winning New England Patriots and on the active roster of the Jacksonville Jaguars.

Inzer played football at North Smithfield High School in Rhode Island and then was a two-year letterman at Brown University (1999–2000), where he had transferred to from Boston University, which had dropped its football program. At Brown, Inzer won an Ivy Football Championship in 1999, served as Tri-Captain in 2000, earned  Ivy League all-league honors, and was awarded the university wide Zucconi Award for sportsmanship in 2001.  He joined the Patriots as an undrafted rookie free agent in 2001, where he received a Super Bowl ring, and then he was on the roster for the Jacksonville Jaguars in 2002 and through August 2003.

He serves as an Economics teacher as well as the offensive line coach at Lawrenceville School. 
He also serves as Housemaster in Lawrenceville in the Hamill House. Along with this, he served as a dorm head for Hayden Hall and Shea Family Cottage at Northfield Mount Hermon School, along with his time teaching/coaching/dorm directing at Bridgton Academy, an all-boys postgraduate school in Maine. In his spare time he enjoys playing the bassoon, fly-fishing, hiking, and raising his children with his high school sweetheart.

References

1979 births
Living people
American football offensive linemen
Brown Bears football players
New England Patriots players
Jacksonville Jaguars players
Players of American football from Rhode Island
People from Woonsocket, Rhode Island